The Communauté d'agglomération du Pays de Fontainebleau is a communauté d'agglomération in the Seine-et-Marne département and in the Île-de-France région of France. It was formed in January 2017 by the merger of the former Communauté de communes du pays de Fontainebleau, the Communauté de communes entre Seine et Forêt and several communes from other communities. Its area is 437.4 km2. Its population was 68,480 in 2018, of which 15,407 in Fontainebleau proper.

Composition 
It includes 26 communes:

Achères-la-Forêt
Arbonne-la-Forêt
Avon
Barbizon
Bois-le-Roi
Boissy-aux-Cailles
Bourron-Marlotte
Cély
Chailly-en-Bière
La Chapelle-la-Reine
Chartrettes
Fleury-en-Bière
Fontainebleau
Héricy
Noisy-sur-École
Perthes
Recloses
Saint-Germain-sur-École
Saint-Martin-en-Bière
Saint-Sauveur-sur-École
Samois-sur-Seine
Samoreau
Tousson
Ury
Le Vaudoué
Vulaines-sur-Seine

References

Intercommunalities of Seine-et-Marne
Agglomeration communities in France